North Cockerington is a small village and civil parish in the East Lindsey district of Lincolnshire, England.

Village population has fluctuated between 150 and 200 since 1801 and currently remains at just below 200, with an equal distribution of males and females.

North Cockerington was formerly known as Cockerington St Mary, distinguishing it from Cockerington St Leonard, now South Cockerington. In 1670 Sir Jarvis Scrope founded six tenements for poor people of North and South Cockerington.

The village has no shops or public houses. The former post office in Meadow Lane, once called Ashdene, is now Pump Cottage. The village school is North Cockerington Church of England Primary School. The school serves the villages of North and South Cockerington, Alvingham, Yarburgh as well as Louth itself.

The Greenwich Prime Zero meridian line passes through the village.

St Mary's Church 

St Mary's Church is a redundant Anglican church in the village of Alvingham, adjacent to North Cockerington. It is recorded in the National Heritage List for England as a designated Grade I listed building, and is under the care of the Churches Conservation Trust.

References

External links 

North Cockerington Church of England Primary School

Villages in Lincolnshire
Civil parishes in Lincolnshire
East Lindsey District